Foro SC is an American soccer club based in Dallas, Texas. The club plays in the North Division of the Central Conference of the United Premier Soccer League, which serves as the de facto fourth tier of American soccer. Keene FC is owned by Matt Kahla, Jr. and Brentt Miller, with former MLS All-Star, José Burciaga Jr. serving as General Manager

Staff

External links 
 Official Website

Association football clubs established in 2017
United Premier Soccer League teams
2017 establishments in Texas
Soccer clubs in Texas